Madison Ferris is an American actress, best known for portraying Laura Wingfield in The Glass Menagerie. She was the first wheelchair user to play a lead on Broadway.

Ferris moved to New York City, and got her first professional performance opportunity as a paid dancer at the Joyce Theater. Ferris performed in two dance pieces, Ballet (New York) and The Show Must Go On by French choreographer Jerome Bel.

The Glass Menagerie
Ferris was traveling in Australia when the casting notice for Sam Gold's revival of The Glass Menagerie was announced. Unable to fly back for the audition, she submitted a videotape. Ferris flew back to the US for a callback, then was asked back again to read with the play's star, Sally Field.  A short time after, Ferris was cast in the role of Laura Wingfield.

Ferris made history as Broadway's first lead actor in a wheelchair. The show opened with the house lights on as Amanda slowly brought Laura up the steps to the stage, right in front of the audience. In discussing how she gave Laura agency, Ferris says,

References

External links

Actresses from Pennsylvania
Muhlenberg College alumni
Living people
American stage actresses
21st-century American actresses
1992 births
People with muscular dystrophy
Actors with disabilities